Subhash Bapurao Wankhede (born 4 January 1963) is an Indian politician and a member of the Shivsena political party. He was the member of the 15th Lok Sabha of India and represents the Hingoli constituency in Maharashtra state.he joined shivsena on 20th of july 2022

External links
 Fifteenth Lok Sabha Members Bioprofile - Wankhede, Shri Subhash Bapurao

Living people
1963 births
Shiv Sena politicians
India MPs 2009–2014
People from Hingoli district
Marathi politicians
Lok Sabha members from Maharashtra
National Democratic Alliance candidates in the 2014 Indian general election
People from Marathwada
Indian National Congress politicians
Indian National Congress politicians from Maharashtra